Malagassodynerus is a monotypic genus of potter wasps endemic to Madagascar.

References

Biological pest control wasps
Monotypic Hymenoptera genera
Potter wasps